Under the Chatham House Rule, anyone who comes to a meeting is free to use information from the discussion, but is not allowed to reveal who made any particular comment. It is designed to increase openness of discussion. The rule is a system for holding debates and discussion panels on controversial topics, named after the headquarters of the UK Royal Institute of International Affairs, based in Chatham House, London, where the rule originated in June 1927.

The rule
The rule was created in 1927 and refined in 1992.  Since its most recent refinement in 2002, the rule states:
 Sometimes the reference is made to Chatham House rules. However, Chatham House states that the singular should be used as there is only one rule.

Purpose
The rule is designed to promote openness of discussion of public policy and current affairs, as it allows people to express and discuss controversial opinions and arguments without suffering the risk of stalling their career or even dismissal from their job, and with a clear separation from the opinion and the view of their employer. 

The rule allows people to speak as individuals and to express views that may not be those of their organisations, and therefore encourages free discussion. Speakers are free to voice their own opinions, and to contest the opinions of other participants, without concern for their personal reputation or their official duties and affiliations. The Chatham House Rule resolves a boundary problem faced by many communities of practice, in that it permits acknowledgement of the community or conversation, while protecting the freedom of interaction that is necessary for the community to carry out its conversations. It is designed to reduce the risk of what has come to be described as groupthink, where unpopular views are excluded from discussion, reducing the range of opinions an organisation can discuss.

The aim of the rule is to guarantee anonymity to those speaking within its walls so that better international relations may be achieved.  The rule is now used internationally as an aid to free discussion.  The original rule of 1927 was refined in October 1992 and again in 2002. Chatham House has translated the rule into Arabic, Chinese, French, German, Portuguese, Spanish and Russian.

Generally, the Chatham House Rule is imposed as a condition of being allowed to attend a meeting or event: all participants are understood to have agreed that it would be conducive to free discussion that they should be subject to the rule for the relevant part of the meeting. The success of the rule may depend upon it being considered morally binding, particularly in circumstances where a failure to comply with the rule may not result in sanction.

European Central Bank usage
The European Central Bank (ECB) sometimes adopts the Chatham House Rule. In May 2015, release of a speech, which adhered to the rule, by ECB board member Benoît Cœuré caused divided opinion as to its use and his self-publication. The Cœuré speech affected currency, and stock and bond markets. Thereafter, ECB invocations of the rule for a question-and-answer session and opening remarks for Cœuré, respectively, by Vice President Vítor Constâncio and fellow board member Peter Praet, gained attention. An ECB governing council member Boštjan Jazbec also had, the same month, convened questions-and-answers, under the rule.

See also 
 Journalism sourcing
 Whistleblower
 Sub rosa

References

External links
  With explanation and link to translations in different languages.

Anonymity
International relations
Meetings
 
1927 introductions